Cocaine Bear (released as Crazy Bear in some countries) is a 2023 American comedy horror thriller film directed by Elizabeth Banks and written by Jimmy Warden. It stars Keri Russell, O'Shea Jackson Jr., Christian Convery, Alden Ehrenreich, Brooklynn Prince, Isiah Whitlock Jr., Margo Martindale, and Ray Liotta. The film is dedicated to Liotta, who died in May 2022.

Cocaine Bear was theatrically released in the United States on February 24, 2023, by Universal Pictures. The film received mixed reviews from critics and has grossed $75 million worldwide against a $30–35 million budget.

Plot
In 1985, drug smuggler Andrew C. Thornton II drops a shipment of cocaine from his plane. He attempts to parachute out with a drug-filled duffel bag, but knocks himself unconscious on the doorframe, causing him to fall to his death. His body lands in Knoxville, Tennessee, where he is identified by Bob, a local detective. He concludes that the cocaine is likely from St. Louis drug kingpin Syd White, and the remainder is missing. Meanwhile, in the Chattahoochee–Oconee National Forest, an American black bear eats some of the cocaine, becoming highly aggressive and attacking two hikers, Elsa and Olaf, killing the former.

In northeast Georgia, middle schooler Dee Dee lives with her mother, nurse Sari. Dee Dee skips school with her best friend Henry in order to paint a picture of the falls in the forest. On the trail to the falls, the pair finds a lost brick of cocaine, and ingest some before they are attacked by the bear. Sari ventures into the forest to search for the children with park ranger Liz and Peter, a wildlife activist. The three find Henry clinging to a tree, hiding from the bear. The bear attacks, sending Peter stumbling through a pile of cocaine and slashing Liz in the process. Attracted to a cocaine-coated Peter, the bear kills him, ignoring Henry. Sari and Henry flee deeper into the forest, and Liz sends for help.

In St. Louis, Syd sends his fixer Daveed to recover the remaining cocaine. Daveed travels to Georgia with Eddie, Syd's son, who has grown depressed following the death of his wife and has abandoned his own son. They arrive in Georgia, as does Bob. At the forest station, Daveed gets into a fight with the Duchamps gang, three delinquents who cause trouble in the forest. One of the members, Stache, takes Daveed and Eddie to recover some of the cocaine he stashed in a gazebo. Liz arrives back at the station, pursued by the bear. Liz accidentally kills Ponytail, one of the Duchamps, before the bear slaughters Vest, the other one. Paramedics Beth and Tom arrive and collect Liz after a brief skirmish with the bear. They leave with Liz in an ambulance, but the bear pursues and jumps into the vehicle. In the ensuing chaos, Tom is killed by the bear, while Liz falls out of the ambulance and is crushed on the road. Beth loses control of the ambulance and crashes into a tree, causing her to fly through the windshield to her death.

Sari and Henry discover that Dee Dee left them a trail of paint, which they use to track her. Daveed and Eddie are taken to the gazebo, but find Bob there with the stashed duffel of cocaine. The bear appears, but Bob distracts it with the bag of coke. Bob is suddenly shot fatally by Syd, who reveals that he is under pressure by his superiors to retrieve the cocaine.

Sari and Henry find a mourning Olaf, who leads them to Dee Dee's hiding place: the bear's cave containing its two cubs, revealing that the bear is a mother. Olaf leaves and is killed by the bear. Syd, Eddie, and Daveed find the cave, which leads out to a ledge behind the falls. The bear returns to the cave. Sari, Henry, and Dee Dee jump into the water below to safety, followed by Eddie and Daveed—who have chosen to quit the drug business together—and they all survive. However, Syd refuses to leave the bag of cocaine found in the cave. He shoots and wounds the bear but is unsuccessful in killing it and is disemboweled by the bear and her cubs.

Later, Stache hitchhikes to New York with a duffel bag of cocaine, while Eddie, accompanied by Daveed, reunites with his son.

Cast

Inspiration

The film is loosely inspired by the events surrounding a  American black bear that died after ingesting a duffel bag full of cocaine in December 1985. The cocaine had been dropped out of an airplane piloted by Andrew C. Thornton II, a former narcotics officer and convicted drug smuggler, because his plane was carrying too heavy a load. Thornton then jumped out of the plane with a faulty parachute and died. The bear, who died sometime after consuming the cocaine, was found three months later in northern Georgia alongside 40 opened plastic containers of cocaine. The bear is currently on display at the Kentucky for Kentucky Fun Mall in Lexington, Kentucky, which named the creature "Cocaine Bear" in 2015.

Creative liberties
The film's plot differs from real-life events in a number of ways. Notably, the real-life Cocaine Bear is not known to have killed anyone after consuming drugs, and what transpired in the time leading up to its death from overdose is unknown. In an interview with Varietys Adam B. Vary, Banks stated that "this movie could be seen as that bear's revenge story."

Response to the film  
Prior to the film's release, the story behind Cocaine Bear went viral on social media. Yasmin Tayag of The Atlantic wrote that part of the film's popularity on social media may have been due to the appeal of man versus nature narratives or the shock value of the premise. However, she noted that the bear was also presented in a sympathetic light by the film.

Production
In December 2019, Phil Lord and Christopher Miller were announced to be producing an untitled horror comedy project inspired by the true story, and based on a spec script written by Jimmy Warden. The producers approached Radio Silence collectives Matt Bettinelli-Olpin and Tyler Gillett to direct, but both opted out of the film in favor of making the fifth Scream installment.

On March 9, 2021, Universal Pictures announced that the film was in development. It was also confirmed that the film would instead be directed by Elizabeth Banks, and produced by Banks and Max Handelman for Brownstone Productions, who joined the producing team alongside Lord, Miller, Aditya Sood for Lord Miller Productions, and Brian Duffield. The ensemble cast was revealed between July and August 2021.

Principal photography took place in County Wicklow, Ireland, between August 20 and October 17, 2021. The production budget was $3035 million, with a large portion of it going to Wētā FX to create the bear with CGI.

Music 
In February 2022, Natalie Holt was reported to compose the film score. However, Mark Mothersbaugh replaced her as composer in November 2022. It marks his second collaboration with Banks after Pitch Perfect 2 (2015).

The film's trailer made use of the song "White Lines (Don't Don't Do It)" by Melle Mel, which also plays in the film's end credits.

Release
Cocaine Bear was theatrically released on February 24, 2023, by Universal Pictures.

Reception

Box office 

, Cocaine Bear has grossed $58.5 million in the United States and Canada, and $16.5 million in other territories, for a worldwide total of $75 million.

In the United States and Canada, Cocaine Bear was released alongside Jesus Revolution and was initially projected to gross $15–20 million from 3,534 theaters in its opening weekend. The film made $8.7 million on its first day, including $2 million from Thursday night previews. It went on to debut to $23.1 million, finishing second behind holdover Ant-Man and the Wasp: Quantumania. The film finished in third place in its sophomore weekend with $11 million (dropping 54%), which was noted as a "very good hold" for a genre film. In it's third weekend, the film finished in fifth place with $6.2 million.

Critical response 
  Audiences surveyed by CinemaScore gave the film an average grade of "B–" on an A+ to F scale, while those polled by PostTrak gave it an 80% positive score, with 67% saying they would definitely recommend it.

Richard Roeper of the Chicago Sun-Times gave the film 3/4 stars, describing it as a "wildly entertaining and darkly hilarious B-movie blood-fest" and "genuinely well-crafted horror." In a same star review, ReelViews reviewer James Berardinelli called it a "95 minutes of escapist fare." Although he criticised the number of characters, subplots and pacing, he concluded that the film was "silly but not stupid." Likewise, Christy Lemire of RogerEbert.com criticised the characters but her review was also overall positive. She noted that the film was "not that profound." "But it is an incredible blast, especially if you have the benefit of seeing director Elizabeth Banks' insanely violent comedy/thriller with a packed crowd." The Observer film critic Mark Kermode rated the film 3/5, saying "It may not be Grizzly Man meets Scarface, but it leaves Snakes on a Plane standing on the runway."

Writing for CBC.ca, Eli Glasner found the film disappointing, writing: "Does the bear roar? Does it live up to the hype? Does it fulfil the potent promise of that amazing title? Technically yes, but there's a wide chasm between what the audience wants Cocaine Bear to be, and what it delivers." In a negative review, Nicholas Barber of BBC criticised the human characters and their interactions. He wrote, "Instead of showing us the moment when the title character discovered and ingested the drugs, the film keeps introducing more and more characters who could have been in the first draft of a Coen brothers script".

See also
Attack of the Meth Gator, a mockbuster inspired by Cocaine Bear

References

External links
 
 

2023 comedy films
2023 horror thriller films
2020s American films
2020s black comedy films
2020s comedy horror films
2020s comedy thriller films
2020s English-language films
American black comedy films
American comedy horror films
American comedy thriller films
American films based on actual events
Brownstone Productions films
Comedy films based on actual events
Fictional cocaine users
Films about bears
Films about cocaine
Films about the illegal drug trade
Films directed by Elizabeth Banks
Films produced by Elizabeth Banks
Films produced by Phil Lord and Christopher Miller
Films scored by Mark Mothersbaugh
Films set in 1985
Films set in forests
Films set in Georgia (U.S. state)
Films shot in County Wicklow
Horror films based on actual events
Thriller films based on actual events
Universal Pictures films